Diccon Edwards (born 13 March 1973) is an English former rugby union and professional rugby league footballer who played in the 1990s. He played representative level rugby league (RL) for Wales. He is currently coach of Leeds Carnegie Academy  and Otley RUFC.

He played club rugby union for Selby RUFC, Wakefield, Leicester Tigers, Newport RFC, Leeds Carnegie and Selby and rugby league for Castleford (Heritage № 729).

He was educated at Pocklington School and played for England Under-16s  and Under-18s. He also played for England Colts and Under-21 levels and made his Yorkshire début during the 1992/93 season. He also toured South Africa with the North in 1995. and played for the North against Queensland.

He played once for the Wales (RL), qualifying through his Welsh father.

He retired through a shoulder and neck problem.

References

 Wakefield Rugby Football Club—1901-2001 A Centenary History. Written and compiled by David Ingall in 2001.

1973 births
Living people
Alumni of Loughborough University
Castleford Tigers players
English people of Welsh descent
English rugby league players
English rugby union players
Footballers who switched code
Leeds Tykes players
Leicester Tigers players
Newport RFC players
Rugby league players from London
Rugby league wingers
Rugby union centres
Rugby union players from London
Wakefield RFC players
Wales national rugby league team players